Oiana Blanco is a Spanish judoka who competes in the women's 48 kg category. At the 2012 Summer Olympics, she was defeated in the first round.

References

External links
 
 

Spanish female judoka
Living people
Year of birth missing (living people)
Olympic judoka of Spain
Judoka at the 2012 Summer Olympics
21st-century Spanish women